El Sobrante can refer to:

El Sobrante, Contra Costa County, California
Rancho El Sobrante, the original land grant for the area
El Sobrante, Riverside County, California
John Kiffmeyer, The original drummer of green day's nickname

See also
El Sobrante Hills, a neighborhood in Richmond, California